Pestrikovo may refer to:

Pestrikovo, Moscow Oblast, a village (selo) in Moscow Oblast, Russia
Pestrikovo, Tver Oblast, a village in Tver Oblast, Russia